Bhanita Das is an Indian actress who works in Assamese language films. She is known for her role as Dhunu in the 2017 drama Village Rockstars that won many awards including four National Film Awards. The film was also selected as India's official entry to the 91st Academy Awards. Bhanita is a recipient of the National Film Award for Best Child Artist.

Personal life 
Bhanita was born in Chhaygaon, Assam. She is an elementary school girl and lives with her widowed mother who does farming to make end meets. Bhanita is the younger sister of Mallika Das, who is pursuing degree in Chaygaon and was given an opportunity to assist Village Rockstars' director Rima Das.

Village Rockstars 
Bhanita was signed by Rima Das to play the lead role. In this film she has played Dhunnu, a ten-year-old girl who is on the lookout for an electric guitar in her village so that she can start a rock band of her own with friends.

Awards

References

External links 

 

Living people
Actresses in Assamese cinema
Best Child Artist National Film Award winners
Year of birth missing (living people)